Perranporth is a seaside resort town on the north coast of Cornwall, England, United Kingdom. It is 2.1 miles east of the St Agnes Heritage Coastline, and around 7 miles south-west of Newquay. It has a population of 3,066, and is the largest settlement in the civil parish of Perranzabuloe. It has an electoral ward in its own name whose population was 4,270 in the 2011 census.

The town's modern name comes from Porth Peran, the Cornish for The Cove of Saint Piran who is the patron saint of Cornwall. He founded the St Piran's Oratory on Penhale Sands, near Perranporth, in the 7th century. The Oratory was buried under sand dunes for many centuries, being unearthed in the 19th century (reference required).

History
The ship Voorspoed ran ashore in a northerly gale in Perran Bay on 7 March 1901 whilst travelling from Cardiff to Bahia. The wreck was one of the last to be looted.

Perranporth Airfield, built during World War II as an RAF fighter station, is now a civil airfield. It is located at Cligga Head, on the plateau above the cliffs.

Until the 1960s, Perranporth was served by a railway line. Built as the Truro and Newquay Railway, the line ran from Chacewater to Newquay and the principal intermediate stop was Perranporth station. Perranporth also had a second station, known as Perranporth Beach Halt.

Geography
Perranporth is centred on a main street, St Piran's Road, part of the B3285 Newquay to St Agnes road. The town centre has various shops, cafés and pubs. The long-distance South West Coast Path runs past the town. There is a long-distance coach service provided by National Express (service 316) which runs between London and Perranporth.

Perranporth is a popular family holiday destination. The beach faces west onto Perran Bay and the Atlantic Ocean and is a popular surfing location. There are lifeguard beach patrols from May to September and the beach is generally safe for bathing, although there are dangerous rip currents around Chapel Rock at ebb tides. Perran Sands is a sprawling holiday camp and caravan site to the north of the town centre.

At the south end of the beach are cliffs with natural arches, natural stacks and tin-mining adits. There is a youth hostel above the cliffs at Droskyn Point. Nearby is the 19th-century Droskyn Castle, formerly a hotel and now divided into apartments.

Protected areas
Perran beach is backed by extensive sand dunes which reach nearly a mile inland. Known as Penhale Sands, the dunes are used for orienteering competitions, and there is an 18-hole links golf course.

The far northern end of the beach is used as a naturist beach, although the MoD discouraged naturism in the sand dunes that bordered their property.

The dunes are also a valuable resource for wildlife, with many rare plants and insects including Cornwall's largest colony of the silver-studded blue, a Red Data Book species.

Southwest of Perranporth, the coast becomes more rocky, with cliffs rising to about 300 feet (90 metres) at Cligga Head. These cliffs form the Cligga Head SSSI (Site of Special Scientific Interest), noted for its geological and biological characteristics.

Annual events

The "Perranporth Shout" Sea-song and Shanty Festival is held over the third weekend in April, with performers from as far away as Scotland and Norway. It has expanded over the last nine years to be a three-day, five venue occasion. In 2016 the name was changed to 'The Loudest Shout', in recognition of the new event on the Friday night when up to 60 singers take part in a mass singing session.
Perranporth used to host an inter-Celtic festival each October, Lowender Peran, drawing people in from Cornwall and the other five Celtic nations.  The festival moved to nearby Newquay when the hotel that hosted it closed in 2015.
Perranporth SLSC holds an Extreme Surf Triathlon every September that involves a swim in Perranporth Sea, followed by a cycle on the hills around Perranporth, then finished with a 'painful' run around the dunes and cliffs including Flat Rocks. See more info
 Perranporth's Annual "Tunes in the Dunes" music festival features top artists such as Tom Walker, Craig David, Fatboy Slim and many more. The festival is hosted on the famous sand dunes of Perranporth, which many thousand attend.

Places of worship, associations and clubs
The parish church, which is in the Anglo-Catholic tradition of the Church of England, is in Perranzabuloe. An Anglican chapel of ease in Perranporth dedicated to St Michael opened in 1872 and seats 100 people.

The town also has its own Roman Catholic church, dedicated to Christ the King, on Wheal Leisure Road, which is part of the Diocese of Plymouth. Dom Charles Norris completed stained glass windows for the church of Christ the King.

Masonic and fraternal associations
The town's Masonic centre in Liskey Hill is home to 16 Masonic bodies, which makes it one of the foremost centres of Masonic activity in Cornwall.

There used to be a Lodge of the Independent Order of Odd Fellows (Manchester Unity), who at one time, owned the Odd Fellows Hall near the Ponsmere Hotel, but due to declining numbers this Lodge closed and the building is now rented by Cornwall Council as the town's library. The Oddfellows building is owned by Perranzabuloe Museum, which has a display gallery and research area above the library.

Sport
Surfing is popular in Perranporth with its long sands and beach break. The Perranporth Surf Life Saving Club is one of the oldest in the country and hosts an extreme triathlon event every autumn. The beach is a destination for kite surfing enthusiasts. There is a golf club, Perranporth Golf Club, just north of the town, while the football team Perranporth A.F.C. play in Division One West of the South West Peninsula League. There is a rugby club, "The Brewers", and a tennis club.

Notable people
These include:
 Motor engineer and designer Donald Healey, who opened the first garage/petrol station in the town in 1919; a nearby cider farm run by a grandson of his has a detailed graphic display about his life.
 Author Winston Graham, who lived in Perranporth for many years and whose Poldark novels are based on the area.

Gallery

References

External links

 
 Cornwall Record Office Online Catalogue for Perranporth

Villages in Cornwall
Seaside resorts in Cornwall
Populated coastal places in Cornwall
Beaches of Cornwall
Surfing locations in Cornwall
Sites of Special Scientific Interest in Cornwall
Nude beaches